Kaante is a 2002 Indian Hindi-language action-thriller film directed by Sanjay Gupta, written by Milap Zaveri, and starring an ensemble cast including Amitabh Bachchan, Sanjay Dutt, Kumar Gaurav, Sunil Shetty, Lucky Ali, Mahesh Manjrekar, Namrata Singh Gujral, Rati Agnihotri, Rohit Roy, Isha Koppikar and Malaika Arora. Set in Los Angeles, the film follows six Indian men who are detained without evidence by the police. Feeling wronged and vengeful, they team up to plot a bank heist that would leave the Los Angeles Police Department penniless. However, once things go out of hand, they start suspecting each other's identities, resulting in violence and chaos.

Kaante was heavily inspired by Quentin Tarantino's Reservoir Dogs (1992) as well as the film that inspired it, Ringo Lam's City on Fire (1987). According to Tarantino, Kaante is his favorite among the many films that were heavily inspired by his work.

Kaante was released theatrically on 20 December 2002. The film was a success at the box office, with first-week earnings of £1.8million in India, nearly $1million in the United States, and £268,507 in Britain. The film's final worldwide gross was 430million ($9million), including  331.2million in India and $2.05 million overseas.

Plot 
In Los Angeles, six men of Indian origin, with a criminal record, are detained by the police and interrogated about stealing a truck full of laptops and its whereabouts. Their deep antipathy towards the police for arresting them without any evidence, just because the witnesses had seen an Indian at the crime scene, grows into a daring plot. Sparked off by Jay "Ajju" Trehan (Sanjay Dutt) and seconded by Yashvardhan "Major" Rampal (Amitabh Bachchan), they all hatch a plan to rob the bank (American Services Bank) in which lies the funding for the Los Angeles Police Department. In return, Ajju reveals that he stole the truck and splits the steal with everyone else.

Marc Issak (Suniel Shetty) is a bouncer who hates that his girlfriend has to work as a club-dancer and wants to rescue her from the club owner Cyrus (Gulshan Grover), by paying him the required money. He also has an ongoing spat with Ajju about his girlfriend. Major has a sick wife who he has to look after by supplying her with medicines and injections. Andy (Kumar Gaurav) is a software engineer having divorce and custody troubles, as his wife won't let him meet their child. He is also jobless and has financial troubles. Bali (Mahesh Manjrekar) and Mak (Lucky Ali) are two drug-peddlers who live off the street selling and buying illicit drugs under a drug lord. They meet when Bali is being chased by some drug dealers and meets Mak in an alley where he is adjusting something in his car. He agrees to save him only if he splits his loot. They agree to work thereafter.

After the six guys get released from jail, they meet up again to discuss the bank robbery. Andy believes the loot from the truck Ajju stole earlier would be enough to gain custody of his son, but when his lawyer tells him that the money is insufficient, he again goes back to the gang. On a hotel roof top, they start planning the robbery in which they familiarize themselves with the bank and get cars, weapons and gadgets to do this. Soon they establish their hideout in a warehouse where Major reveals that the bank will be looted the next day instead of the day after as previously planned, to thwart anyone's hidden agendas.

The robbery proceeds as planned, but they find a SWAT team waiting for them outside the bank. They are engaged in a gunfight, and Mak is hit by a bullet while saving Major. They all escape and meet at their hideout. Mak, who was hit, is not allowed to be taken to the hospital, and Major treats his wound with some Black Label Whiskey. They all have verbal scuffles after which, Ajju, reveals that he has kidnapped the Police Chief. They interrogate him and learn that one of them is an undercover cop. This strikes suspicion among them, and they decide to bring the stolen amount to their hideout. Major learns that his wife has died. Ajju befriends Marc and tells him to elope with his girlfriend, where he also reveals that he actually knows English and was purposefully talking nonsense to the cops. When they return, they find Bali dead, killed by Mak for being inhuman in his interrogation of the Police Chief. Ajju reasons that Mak is the undercover cop, but Major disagrees because he believes Mak saved him during the gunfight at the bank. Marc backs up Ajju and points his gun at Major. They all arrive at a Mexican stand-off, as Andy retreats and runs away with the money. The four of them shoot each other, after which Major apologizes to Mak for not saving him. In reply, Mak apologizes, saying he was just doing his duty as he is the undercover cop, and that he was the one who buzzed the cops at the bank to arrive. Major realises his mistake and shoots the already dying Mak in the head. Marc's girlfriend is shown waiting for him at the airport, and Andy is shown at the end driving off the highway pursued by a police helicopter, with Mak's voice narrating the story, leaving the end to the discretion of the audience, followed by ending credits.

Cast 
Amitabh Bachchan as Yashvardhan "Major" Rampal
Sanjay Dutt as Jai "Ajju" Rehan
Suniel Shetty as Marc Issac 
Mahesh Manjrekar as Raja "Bali" Yadav
Lucky Ali as Maqbool "Mak" Haider
Kumar Gaurav as Anand "Andy" Mathur
Rati Agnihotri as Major's wife
Malaika Arora as Lisa, Marc's girlfriend
Namrata Singh Gujral as Renu A. Mathur
Gulshan Grover as Cyrus, the club owner.
Sanjay Sippy as Mr. Adler
Isha Koppikar as an item number "Ishq Samundar" (special appearance)
Rohit Roy as himself in song "Ishq Samundar" (special appearance)

Production 

The film was to star Sanjay Dutt, Sunil Shetty, Mahesh Manjrekar, Kumar Gaurav, Akshaye Khanna, Shilpa Shetty and Lisa Ray initially. Akshaye Khanna opted out and was replaced by Lucky Ali, Malaika Arora stepped into Lisa Ray's shoes and Namrata Singh Gujral was cast opposite Kumar Gaurav in lieu of Shilpa Shetty. Sunny Deol was offered Kumar Gaurav's role at one point. Isha Koppikar was signed for a full-fledged role opposite Sanjay Dutt which got relegated to just the song "Ishq Samandar" because of length concerns. Rohit Roy (from Shootout at Lokhandwala and a popular television actor) also makes an appearance in the song.

The film was the first Bollywood film to be completely shot in Los Angeles. The film's production team used Hollywood technicians. The filming was completed in 35 days. Namrata Singh Gujral was the only role cast in Hollywood from the principal cast. All other principals including Amitabh Bachchan were flown in from Mumbai for the Hollywood shoot.

Reception 
Kaante holds an 83% rating on Rotten Tomatoes, a website that rates films based on published reviews by critics, averaging a score of 6.4 out of 10 from 6 reviews. Taran Adarsh of Bollywood Hungama gave the film three and a half stars out of five and stated, "Kaante takes a step forward in terms of content and technique. An apt example of progressive cinema that breaks the shackles of stereotype, the film has everything to woo the cinegoer: an impressive cast, grandiose look, an excellent second half, well executed stunts, popular music and eroticism in plenty". Prem Panicker of Rediff criticized the film saying "A more taut script, a little less of indulgence in directing, a tad more ruthlessness in editing, and this film could have pulled off a badly needed box office heist." A reviewer at Sify awarded the film three and a half stars out of five and wrote, "A film far ahead of its time in terms of execution, Kaante is a visual delight. And combined with good performances and superb action, it's a must-see this season."

Derek Elley of Variety praised the direction and performances of the lead cast, saying, "From the protags' initial meeting, heavy on closeups, Gupta directs the film primarily as a character piece, with Bachchan, Dutt and semi-comic relief Manjrekar driving the drama with richly characterized roles. Shetty, a tightly wound actor at the best of times, strikes few sparks as the nightclub bouncer, and his scenes with Arora as the chanteuse are flat." Dave Kehr of The New York Times reviewed the film writing, "A delirious Bollywood reimagining of Reservoir Dogs, complete with musical numbers, Sanjay Gupta's Kaante shifts as fluidly between cinematic idioms as it does between Hindi and English." Kevin Thomas of the Los Angeles Times said, "there is a steadfast earnestness in director Sanjay Gupta's deluded attempt to equal or even better Hollywood on its own ground that is rather touching -- but not to the degree that it sustains the film's many tedious stretches."

Quentin Tarantino cited Kaante as his favourite among the many films that were heavily inspired by his work. He praised the film's character-building for going beyond what he was able to do with Reservoir Dogs. Tarantino stated: "Here I am, watching a film that I've directed and then it goes into each character's background. And I'm like, 'Whoa'. For, I always write backgrounds and stuff, and it always gets chopped off during the edit. And so I was amazed on seeing this. I felt, this isn't Reservoir Dogs. But then it goes into the warehouse scene, and I am like, 'Wow, it's back to Reservoir Dogs'. Isn't it amazing!" He also praised Amitabh Bachchan's performance. Tarantino later screened Kaante at his New Beverly Cinema alongside Reservoir Dogs and City on Fire.

Awards 

 48th Filmfare Awards:

Nominated

 Best Film – Pritish Nandy & Sanjay Sippy
 Best Director – Sanjay Gupta
 Best Actor – Amitabh Bachchan
 Best Supporting Actor – Sanjay Dutt
 Best Comedian – Mahesh Manjrekar
 Best Music Director – Anand Raaj Anand

Soundtrack 

The songs were mainly composed by Anand Raj Anand, while Vishal–Shekhar and Lucky Ali were guest composers. Lyrics are penned by Dev Kohli and Vishal Dadlani. According to the Indian trade website Box Office India, with around 18,00,000 units sold, this film's soundtrack addalbum was the year's fourth highest-selling. Tracks like 'Maahi ve', 'Rama re' and 'Ishq Samundar' got good popularity.

The song "Ishq Samundar", was re-made for the Film Teraa Surroor which was sung by Himesh Reshammiya and Kanika Kapoor. The song Maahi Ve was recreated by Gourav-Roshin in the voice of Neha Kakkar for the film Wajah Tum Ho.

Track listing

References

External links 

 
 
 
 
 Cult of Kumar

2002 films
2000s Hindi-language films
2000s heist films
Indian action thriller films
Films scored by Anand Raj Anand
Films scored by Gregor Narholz
2002 action thriller films
Films set in Los Angeles
Films set in the United States
Indian heist films
Films shot in Los Angeles
Films scored by Vishal–Shekhar
Fictional portrayals of the Los Angeles Police Department
Indian remakes of American films
Films directed by Sanjay Gupta